Ferndale is a hamlet in the Town of Liberty, Sullivan County, New York, United States. It is situated along the old alignment of New York Route 17 between Harris and Liberty. The zip code is 12734.

References

Hamlets in New York (state)
Hamlets in Sullivan County, New York